The Kaiser Max class of broadside ironclads was a group of three vessels built for the Austro-Hungarian Navy in the 1860s. They were an improved version of the preceding , being larger, carrying a larger gun battery, and having more powerful engines. The three ships were all laid down in 1861, launched in 1862, and completed in 1863.

Don Juan d'Austria took part in the Second Schleswig War in 1864 but did not see combat. Two years later, Austria was attacked by Prussia and Italy in the Seven Weeks' War; a major naval engagement was fought against Italy at the Battle of Lissa in July 1866, where all three ships saw action. After the war, they were modernized, but did not see further active service. In poor condition by 1873, the Navy decided to discard the ships. But because parliament refused to budget funds to build replacements, the commander of the Navy, Friedrich von Pöck requested permission to "rebuild" the three Kaiser Maxes, which was granted. In fact, the three ships were broken up, with only their engines, armor plate, and some other equipment being reused in the new ships.

Design
Following the launch of the French , the world's first ironclad warship, the Austrian Navy began a major ironclad construction program under the direction of Archduke Ferdinand Max, the Marinekommandant (naval commander) and brother of Kaiser Franz Josef I, the emperor of Austria. These ships were designed by the Director of Naval Construction Josef von Romako; he based the design for the three new ships on the Drache class, but enlarged it and incorporated more powerful engines. The new ships also carried more guns.

General characteristics and machinery
They displaced . Wooden hulled vessels, they proved to be very wet forward and had to have their bows rebuilt in 1867. Each ship originally had a bow figurehead, which was removed during the reconstruction. They were also very unstable ships, pitching badly and having very bad seakeeping. The ships had a crew of 386.

Their propulsion system consisted of one single-expansion, 2-cylinder, horizontal steam engine that drove a single screw propeller. The number and type of their coal-fired boilers have not survived, though they were trunked into a single funnel located amidships. Don Juan d'Austria was capable of only . They were fitted with a three-masted rig to supplement the steam engines.

Armament and armor
The ships of the Kaiser Max class were broadside ironclads. Kaiser Max and Prinz Eugen were armed with a main battery of sixteen 48-pounder muzzle-loading guns, while Don Juan d'Austria received fourteen of the guns. The ships also carried fifteen 24-pounder  rifled muzzle-loading guns manufactured by Wahrendorff. They also carried two smaller guns, one 12-pounder and one 6-pounder. In 1867, the ships were rearmed with a battery of twelve  muzzle-loaders manufactured by Armstrong and two  guns.

Ships

Service history

During the Second Schleswig War of 1864, Don Juan d'Austria was deployed with the ship of the line  and two other vessels to the North Sea, but arrived too late to take part in any fighting, then-Commodore Wilhelm von Tegetthoff having already inflicted a strategic defeat on the Danish squadron at the Battle of Heligoland. All three ships saw action during the Seven Weeks' War that pitted Austria against Prussia and Italy two years later. The war at sea culminated at the Battle of Lissa in July 1866, where all three ships were heavily engaged, though they were not seriously damaged and inflicted little on their Italian opponents. Neither side's ships carried guns strong enough to defeat their opponents armor plating. After the war, the ships were disarmed and laid up.

In 1867, the ships were drydocked to correct some of their handling deficiencies, and install their new rifled guns. They did not return to active service after the work was completed, however. Severely reduced naval budgets owing to Hungarian disinterest—the Austrian Empire having been replaced by the Dual Monarchy in the postwar Ausgleich—in naval matters prevented the Austro-Hungarian fleet from taking an active policy. As the ships were badly rotted and thoroughly obsolete by the early 1870s, Rear Admiral Friedrich von Pöck, then the commander of the fleet, proposed that the ships be "rebuilt". Some parts of the ships were reused, to include the engines but not the boilers, armor plate, and other miscellaneous equipment to save construction costs.

Notes

References